Larry Smith Puppets (or The Larry Smith Show) was a long-running afternoon television program, seen from 1969 to 1974 on WXIX-TV in Cincinnati, Ohio, geared toward the elementary school aged crowd. It was one of many TV puppet shows created by TV personality Larry Smith and was a favorite of children in the so-called "Tri-State Area" consisting of Southwestern Ohio, Northern Kentucky, and Southeastern Indiana.

Notable Characters included:
 Snarfie R. Dog
 Hattie the Witch
 Rudy the Rooster
 Teaser the Mouse

Mr. Smith ostensibly retired in 2000, but still produces occasional versions of his show. Popular characters from the show are often seen at local events.

External links
 Official Site

Local children's television programming in the United States
1960s American children's television series
1970s American children's television series
1969 American television series debuts
1974 American television series endings
American television shows featuring puppetry
Culture of Cincinnati